The County of Ribagorza or Ribagorça was a medieval county on the southern side of the Pyrenees, including the northeast of modern Aragón and part of the northwest of modern Catalonia, both in Spain. It was originally the independent creation of a local dynasty, later absorbed into the Kingdom of Navarre and then into the Crown of Aragon. It had a strong historical connection with the neighboring counties of Sobrarbe (to the west) and Pallars (to the east). Its territory consisted of the valleys of the rivers Ésera, Isábena, and Noguera Ribagorzana. The seat of its counts was at Benabarre. Other notable towns include Benasque, Graus and Pont de Suert. Today the western portion of the county roughly corresponds to the Aragonese comarca of Ribagorza, with its administrative centre in Graus; the eastern portion roughly corresponds to the Catalan comarca of Alta Ribagorça.

The first history of the region was written in the early fifteenth century and preserved in a fragmentum historicum ex cartulario Alaonis (historical fragment from a cartulary of Alaon), though a genealogy of the ruling dynasty of counts perhaps dating from the early 11th century appears in the Códice de Roda.

List of counts
Raymond I of Pallars and Ribagorza (872–920), son of Lupe, Count of Bigorre. After his death his lands were divided among his four sons, two ruling jointly in Pallars, two in Ribagorza
Miro (920–?), son of Raymond I, jointly with brother Bernard I
Bernard I Humfred (I) (920 – 950/955), son of Raymond I, jointly with brother Miro. Through his marriage to Toda Galíndez of Aragon he and his successors were (sometimes only nominally) also Counts of Sobrarbe.
Raymond II (950/955 – 970), son of Bernard I
Humfred (II) (970–979), son of Raymond II
Arnold (979–990), son of Raymond II
Isarn (990–1003), son of Raymond II
Tota (1003–1010), daughter of Raymond II
Partitioned following intervention by Sancho García of Castile
William Isarn (1010–1018), illegitimate son of Isarn
Mayor García (1010–1025), granddaughter of Raymond II and sister of Sancho García of Castile, until 1019/20 she claimed the county jointly with her husband
Raymond III of Pallars, (1010–1025), distant cousin (both descended from Raymond I) and husband of Mayor García, he was co-claimant until their 1019/20 divorce, then counter-claimant
Sancho III of Pamplona (1018–1035), ruler first of William Isarn's portion, then of the entire county by conquest and submission, he married Muniadona of Castile, niece and eventual heiress of Mayor García and great-granddaughter of Raymond II
Gonzalo (1035–1045), son of Sancho III, ruled as regulus (petty king) or rex (king) of Ribagorza and Sobrarbe
Absorbed into the territories of his brother Ramiro I of Aragon on Gonzalo's death, on occasion created as an appanage.
Sancho Ramírez, illegitimate son of Ramiro I and half-brother of king Sancho Ramírez.
Peter I of Aragon and Navarre appeared as King of Ribagorza and Sobrarbe during the reign of his father, king Sancho Ramírez.
Peter (1322–1381), a younger son of James II of Aragon.
Alfonso of Aragon and Foix (1381–1412), son of Peter
Alfonso of Aragon and Eiximenis (1412–1425), son of Alfonso, following his death the county reverted to the crown of Aragon
Alfonso (1469–1485), illegitimate son of John II of Aragon
John (1485–1512), illegitimate son of predecessor Alfonso
Alfonso (1512–1533), son of John
Martin (1533–1565 and 1573–1581), son of Alfonso
John Alfonso (1565–1573), son of Martin
Ferdinand (1581–1592), son of Martin
Francis (1592–1598), son of Martin

See also 
 Ribagorçan dialect

References

 
Lewis, Archibald Ross. The Development of Southern French and Catalan Society, 718–1050. University of Texas Press: Austin, 1965.

Comarcas of Aragon
Ribagorza